Marino is an Italian surname and a given name of Latin origin meaning "of the sea".

Geographical distribution
As of 2014, 44.8% of all known bearers of the surname Marino were residents of Italy (frequency 1:718), 22.1% of the United States (1:8,584), 6.4% of Argentina (1:3,490), 3.5% of Brazil (1:30,415), 3.2% of Cuba (1:1,908), 3.0% of the Philippines (1:17,883), 2.8% of Mozambique (1:5,167), 2.2% of Mexico (1:30,089), 1.5% of France (1:23,643), 1.1% of Australia (1:11,857) and 1.0% of Canada (1:18,803).

In Italy, the frequency of the surname was higher than national average (1:718) in the following regions:
 Calabria (1:211)
 Sicily (1:216)
 Campania (1:315)
 Basilicata (1:384)
 Molise (1:689)

In Cuba, the frequency of the surname was higher than national average (1:1,908) in the following provinces:
 Las Tunas Province (1:551)
 Holguín Province (1:669)
 Santiago de Cuba Province (1:926)
 Isla de la Juventud (1:1,135)
 Guantánamo Province (1:1,319)

In Argentina, the frequency of the surname was higher than national average (1:3,490) in the following provinces:
 Buenos Aires (1:1,777)
 Buenos Aires Province (1:2,339)
 Formosa Province (1:2,843)

List of persons with surname
 Dan Marino (born 1961), American football player
 Eugene Antonio Marino (1934–2000), American archbishop
 Frank Marino (born 1954), Canadian rock guitarist
 Giambattista Marino (1569–1625), Italian poet
 Giuliana Marino (born 1986), German model
 Ignazio Marino (born 1955), Italian surgeon and politician and former Mayor of Rome
 John Marino (born 1997), American ice hockey player
 Joseph Marino (born 1953), archbishop and Vatican diplomat
 Juan Carlos Marino (Argentine politician) (born 1963), Argentine politician
 Juan Carlos Mariño (born 1982), Peruvian football (soccer) player
 Ken Marino (born 1968), American actor, comedian, director and screenwriter
 Miguel A. Marino, American engineer
 Pedro Mariño de Lobera (1528–1594), Spanish historian and conquistador
 Rebecca Marino (born 1990), Canadian tennis player
 Roger Marino, American engineer and businessman
 Santiago Mariño (1788–1854), Venezuelan independence leader
 Steve Marino (born 1980), American golfer
 Ted Boy Marino (1939-2012), Italian-born Brazilian actor and wrestler
 Tom Marino (born 1952), American politician

List of persons with given name
 Marino Baždarić (born 1978), Croatian basketball player 
 Marino Bifulco (born 1982), Italian football (soccer) player
 Marino Biliškov (born 1976), Croatian footballer
 Marino Bizzi (1570–1624), Dalmatian prelate of the Roman Catholic Church
 Marino Busdachin (born 1956), Italian politician and human rights activist
 Marino Capicchioni (1895–1977), Italian musical instrument maker
 Marino Cardelli (born 1987), San Marinese alpine skier
 Marino Casem (born 1934), American football coach and athletic administrator
 Marino Curnis (born 1973), Italian traveller
 Marino Drake (born 1967), Cuban high jumper
 Marino Facchin (born 1913), Italian boxer
 Marino Faliero (1285–1355), Italian doge of Venice
 Marino Finozzi, Italian politician
 Marino Franchitti (born 1978), Scottish race car driver
 Marino Girolami (1914–1994), Italian film director
 Marino Grimani (died 1546), Italian Cardinal and papal legate
 Marino Keulen (born 1963), Belgian politician
 Marino Lejarreta (born 1957), Spanish cyclist
 Marino Lucas (died 1931), Greek–Australian businessman
 Marino Magrin (born 1959), Italian football (soccer) player
 Marino Marini (sculptor) (1901–1980), Italian sculptor
 Marino Marini (musician) (1924–1997), Italian musician
 Marino Miyata (born 1991), Japanese beauty pageant
 Marino Moretti (1885–1979), Italian poet and author
 Marino Morettini (1931–1990), Italian road bicycle and track cyclist
 Marino Morosini (1181–1253), Italian doge of Venice
 Marino Nicolich (born 1910), Italian football (soccer) player
 Marino Perani (born 1939), Italian football (soccer) player
 Marino Pieretti (1920–1981), Italian–American baseball player
 Marino Rahmberg (born 1974), Swedish football (soccer) player
 Marino Santana (born 1972), Dominican baseball player
 Marino Sato (born 1999), Japanese racing driver
 Marino Tartaglia (1894–1984), Croatian painter and art teacher
 Marino Vanhoenacker (born 1976), Belgian triathlete
 Marino Vigna, Italian cyclist
 Marino Zorzato (born 1956), Italian politician

See also
 Marinus (disambiguation)
 Marin (name)
 Morino (surname)
 Marino (disambiguation)

References

Italian-language surnames
Masculine given names